Aposphragisma is a genus of spiders in the family Oonopidae. It was first described in 2014 by Thoma. , it contains 19 species, most found in Malaysia, Borneo, and other Asian nations.

Species
Aposphragisma comprises the following species:
Aposphragisma baltenspergerae Thoma, 2014
Aposphragisma borgulai Thoma, 2014
Aposphragisma brunomanseri Thoma, 2014
Aposphragisma confluens Thoma, 2014
Aposphragisma dayak Thoma, 2014
Aposphragisma dentatum Thoma, 2014
Aposphragisma draconigenum Thoma, 2014
Aposphragisma hausammannae Thoma, 2014
Aposphragisma helvetiorum Thoma, 2014
Aposphragisma kolleri Thoma, 2014
Aposphragisma menzi Thoma, 2014
Aposphragisma monoceros Thoma, 2014
Aposphragisma nocturnum Thoma, 2014
Aposphragisma retifer Thoma, 2014
Aposphragisma rimba Thoma, 2014
Aposphragisma salewskii Thoma, 2014
Aposphragisma scimitar Thoma, 2014
Aposphragisma sepilok Thoma, 2014
Aposphragisma stannum Thoma, 2014

References

Oonopidae
Araneomorphae genera
Spiders of Asia